The Baltimore Royals (formerly the DC Hawks) are an American professional Twenty20 franchise cricket team that compete in Minor League Cricket (MiLC). The team is based in Baltimore, Maryland. It was formed in 2020 as part of 24 original teams to compete in Minor League Cricket. The franchise is currently owned by Rajit Passey.

The team's home ground is Veterans Memorial Park, located in Woodbridge, Virginia. American international Sunny Sohal currently helms as captain, with former IPL cricketer Bipul Sharma standing by as vice-captain.

Ravi Inder Singh tops the batting leaderboard for the team with 564 runs, while Sarabjit Ladda tops the bowling team with 29 wickets.

Franchise history

Background 
Talks of an American Twenty20 league started in November 2018 just before USA Cricket became the new governing body of cricket in the United States. In May 2021, USA Cricket announced they had accepted a bid by American Cricket Enterprises (ACE) for a US$1 billion investment covering the league and other investments benefitting the U.S. national teams.

In an Annual General Meeting on February 21, 2020, it was announced that USA Cricket was planning to launch Major League Cricket in 2021 and Minor League Cricket that summer, but it was delayed due to the COVID-19 pandemic and due to the lack of high-quality cricket stadiums in the USA. Major League Cricket was pushed to a summer-2023 launch and Minor League Cricket was pushed back to July 31, 2021.

USA Cricket CEO Iain Higgins also pointed out cities such as New York City, Houston and Los Angeles with a large cricket fanbase, and targeted them among others as launch cities for Minor League Cricket.

Following the end of the 2022 season, the team's name was changed to the Baltimore Royals from the DC Hawks.

Exhibition league 
In July 2020, the player registration for the Minor League Cricket exhibition league began. On August 15, 2020, USA Cricket announced the teams participating in the exhibition league matches, also listing the owners for each team. The draft for the exhibition league began on August 22, 2020, with the DC Hawks releasing their squad on September 2. Navin Stewart was later named as captain for the DC Hawks in the exhibition league.

2021 season 

After the conclusion of the exhibition league, USA Cricket announced that they were planning to launch the inaugural season of Minor League Cricket in spring 2021. Ahead of the official season, which was announced to kick off on July 31, they announced Sunny Sohal as captain and Adil Bhatti as vice-captain.

In their first match of the season, they beat the Florida Beamers by 65 runs, but lost to the New England Eagles by 33 runs the same day. They then went on to win against the Philadelphians, the Eagles twice, the Titans, the Stallions, the Yorkers, and the Cavaliers. They additionally lost against the Philadelphians, the Titans, the Stallions, the Yorkers, the Cavaliers, the Fire, and the Param Veers.

The Hawks placed 4th in their group, thus missing the quarter-finals.

2022 season 

Ahead of the 2022 season, Major League Cricket announced that the draft for that season would take place on May 12. Ahead of the official season, it was announced that American international Sunny Sohal would continue to captain the side, with former IPL cricketer Bipul Sharma taking over the role of vice-captain following Adil Bhatti's departure to the Empire State Titans.

Throughout the season, the Hawks lost twice against the Stallions, the Titans, and the Yorkers, lost once against the runners-up Atlanta Fire, won once and lost once against the Eagles and the Philadelphians, won once against the Lions, and won twice against the Cavaliers. Overall, the Hawks ended with a 5-9 win-loss record, securing them fifth in their division and unable to go to the play-offs.

2023 season 
Before the start of the 2023 season, it was announced that the DC Hawks would undergo a name-change to the Baltimore Royals.

Current squad 
 Players with international caps are listed in bold.
  denotes a player who is currently unavailable for selection.
  denotes a player who is unavailable for rest of the season

Statistics

Most runs 

Source: CricClubs, Last updated: 6 March 2022

Most wickets 

Source: CricClubs, Last updated: 5 March 2022

See also 
 2021 Minor League Cricket season
 2021 Minor League Cricket season squads
 2021 Minor League Cricket season final
 Minor League Cricket
 Major League Cricket 
 Houston Hurricanes (cricket)
 Seattle Thunderbolts
 Silicon Valley Strikers
 SoCal Lashings
 New Jersey Stallions (cricket)

References 

Minor League Cricket teams
Cricket teams in Washington, D.C.
Cricket clubs established in 2020
2020 establishments in Washington, D.C.